Olivia Giaccio (born August 15, 2000) is an American freestyle skier who competes internationally. She competed in the 2022 Winter Olympics in women's moguls where she finished 6th overall. Giaccio is currently an undergraduate student at Columbia University.

Olympics results

References

External links

2000 births
Living people
American female freestyle skiers
Freestyle skiers at the 2022 Winter Olympics
Olympic freestyle skiers of the United States
21st-century American women
Columbia College (New York) alumni